The Ireland lunar sample displays are two commemorative plaques consisting of small fragments of Moon rock brought back to Earth by the Apollo 11 and Apollo 17 lunar missions and given to the people of Ireland by United States President Richard Nixon as goodwill gifts.

Apollo 11 samples

Loss

The Ireland lunar sample was displayed at the Dunsink Observatory in Dublin until a 1977 fire. Afterwards, debris was removed to the dump at the Finglas landfill. The lunar display was among this rubble and was accidentally thrown away. Joseph Gutheinz, a former NASA employee and self-appointed private investigator of the Apollo Moon rock displays, called the discarded Moon rocks a "pot of gold under a dump".

Apollo 17 samples

See also
 List of Apollo lunar sample displays

References

Further reading

External links
 Partial list of Apollo  11, 12, 14, 15, 16, and 17 sample locations, NASA Johnson Space Center

Stolen and missing moon rocks
Ireland–United States relations
Science and technology in Ireland